Cu hulu, known in English as The Jealous Wife, is a Chinese novella written in the Ming dynasty by an unknown author.

Plot
Having unsuccessfully tried for 40 years to conceive with her henpecked husband Cheng Gui, Dushi finally permits him to have a concubine. Unfortunately, Cheng finds a woman with an "impenetrable vagina". After discovering that Cheng is having an affair with their maidservant, Dushi flogs her to apparent death. However, the woman survives and Cheng arranges for her to stay with his friend. She subsequently gives birth to a boy, while Dushi is cheated of her money by her godson and sent to Hell. Dushi eventually repents and makes amends with her maidservant.

Publication history
Comprising twenty chapters, the novella was written by an unknown author using the pseudonym "Fucijiao zhu", variously translated into English as "Bishop of the Women-Taming Sect", "Master of Female Submission", "Master of the Doctrine of Subduing Women", or "The Founder of the Teaching on Capitulation to Women", while the "Moon-Heart Master of the Drunken West Lake" wrote a preface to Cu hulu. The novella was published sometime between 1639 and 1640 by the publishing house Bigeng shanfang. An original edition is housed in the National Archives of Japan.

Analysis
The title of the novella, Cu hulu, literally means "Calabash of Vinegar", recalling a Chinese expression for being jealous: "eating vinegar". The protagonist of Cu hulu is a shrew whose surname, Dù, is a homophone for the Chinese word for jealousy ( dù). According to Yenna Wu, the "elaborate descriptions of tortures in the underworld" in Cu hulu were inspired by similar scenes in Stories to Caution the World by Feng Menglong. Keith McMahon suggests that the author intended for Cu hulu to be an "attack on polygamy".

References

Citations

Bibliography

 
 
 
 
 
 
 

17th-century Chinese novels
Chinese novellas
Ming dynasty literature
Works published under a pseudonym
Works of unknown authorship
Novels set in the Song dynasty
Novels set in Zhejiang